In temporal databases, transaction time (TT) is the time during which a fact stored in the database is considered to be true. As of December 2011, ISO/IEC 9075, Database Language SQL:2011 Part 2: SQL/Foundation included clauses in table definitions to define "system-versioned tables" (that is, transaction-time tables).

In a database table transaction interval is often represented as an interval allowing the system to "remove" entries by using two table-columns StartTT and EndTT. The time interval is closed at its lower bound and open at its upper bound.

When the ending transaction time is unknown, it may be considered as "Until Changed".  Academic researchers and some RDBMS have represented "Until Changed" with the largest timestamp supported or the keyword "forever".  This convention is not technically precise.

The term was coined by Richard T. Snodgrass and his doctoral student Ilsoo Ahn.

See also
 Valid time
 Decision time
 Using Transaction time

References

Database management systems
Transaction processing